The Gotha Go 345 was a prototype German Military transport glider of the Second World War. A single example was tested in 1944.

Variants
Go 345AThe assault transport base-line version, optionally fitted with 2x Argus As014 pulse-jet sustainer engines under the wings. 
Go 345BA dedicated cargo variant with no provision for passengers. A shortened nose swung upwards complete with the crew compartment to gain access to the cargo compartment; one built.

Specifications (Go 345A)

References

Further reading

External links

 

Go 345
1940s German military transport aircraft
Aircraft first flown in 1944
Military gliders